Flaviramulus aquimarinus is a Gram-negative, facultative anaerobic, rod-shaped and non-motile bacterium from the genus of Flaviramulus which has been isolated from seawater from the Suncheon Bay in Korea.

References

Sphingobacteriia
Bacteria described in 2015